James Pickard was an English inventor. He modified the Newcomen engine in a manner that it could deliver a rotary motion. His solution, which he patented in 1780, involved the combined use of a crank and a flywheel.

James Watt's company Boulton and Watt circumvented Pickard's patent, with an invention of their employee William Murdoch, the so-called sun and planet gear, patented by Watt in 1781.

References
Nuvolari, A. / Verspagen, B. / von Tunzelmann, N. (2003) The Diffusion of the Steam Engine in Eighteenth-Century Britain, Paper to be presented at the 50th Annual North American Meetings of the Regional Science Association International, Philadelphia, 20–22 November 2003.
https://web.archive.org/web/20060518065034/http://fp.tm.tue.nl/ecis/Working%20Papers/Eciswp100.pdf

English inventors
Year of death unknown
Year of birth unknown